Sani Čampara (born March 3rd, 1999) is a Bosnian professional basketball player currently playing for Zadar of the ABA League and the Croatian League. He also represents the Bosnia and Herzegovina national team internationally.

External links
 Profile at aba-liga.com
 Profile at eurobasket.com
 Profile at proballers.com
 Profile at archive.fiba.com
 Profile at realgm.com

1999 births
Living people
Basketball players from Sarajevo
OKK Spars players
BC Andorra players
Expatriate basketball people in Andorra
OKK Sloboda Tuzla players
KK Split players
KK Zadar players
Bosnia and Herzegovina expatriate basketball people in Spain
Bosnia and Herzegovina basketball players
Point guards
Palencia Baloncesto players